The year 1752 in architecture involved some significant events.

Buildings and structures

Buildings

 Valletta Waterfront on Malta is built, including the Church of the Flight into Egypt.
 Mansion House, London, designed by George Dance the Elder, is completed.
 West wing of St Bartholomew's Hospital, London, designed by James Gibbs, is built.
 Mariinskyi Palace in Kyiv is completed by Ivan Fyodorovich Michurin to the design of Francesco Bartolomeo Rastrelli.
 Khan As'ad Pasha, Damascus is completed.
 Rebuilding of church of San Biagio, Venice, probably by Filippo Rossi, is completed.
 Church of La Visitation-de-la-Bienheureuse-Vierge-Marie on the island of Montreal, designed by Philippe Liébert is consecrated.
 Opéra-Théâtre de Metz Métropole in Metz, Lorraine, designed by Jacques Oger (begun 1732) is opened.
 Osteiner Hof in Mainz (Rhineland), designed by Johann Valentin Thomann, is completed.
 Croome Court in Worcestershire, England, designed by Capability Brown and Sanderson Miller, is completed.
 Pollok House near Glasgow in Scotland, designed by William Adam is built.
 Kinbuck Bridge in Scotland is built.
 Town Hall of Wissembourg in France is inaugurated

Births
 January 18 – John Nash, English architect (died 1835)
 March 5 – Leendert Viervant the Younger, Dutch architect (died 1801)
Charles-Louis Balzac, French architect and architectural draughtsman (died 1820)

Deaths
 João Frederico Ludovice, born Johann Friedrich Ludwig, German architect working in Portugal (born 1670)
 Daniel Marot, French émigré architect and interior designer (born 1661)

References